is a Japanese guitarist who was born April 4, 1971, in Kanagawa Prefecture, Japan. He was formerly a member of the amateur band pee-ka-boo, but he is mainly known for his work in the band Do As Infinity alongside Tomiko Van and Dai Nagao. After the disbanding of Do As Infinity, he started working with his new band, Missile Innovation. Ryo has also collaborated with some Avex label artists like Ai Otsuka and Ayumi Hamasaki.

He is married to a Japanese Office Lady whose identity has been tightly concealed. He also has a son, but the family chooses not to disclose any information related him.

References 

1971 births
21st-century guitarists
21st-century Japanese male musicians
Japanese musicians
Living people
Musicians from Kanagawa Prefecture
Musicians from Yokohama